CTZ may refer to:

 Chemoreceptor trigger zone in neuroscience
 CTZ is the ICAO airline designator for CATA Línea Aérea, Argentina
 CTZ is the IATA airport code for Sampson County Airport, United States
 CTZ is the United States Federal Aviation Administration location identifier for Sampson County Airport
 Chelyabinsk Tractor Plant, Russia
 Cyclothiazide, a positive allosteric modulator of the AMPA receptor
 Central Time Zone
 Count trailing zeros, a computer programming bit operation